The Love is an American restaurant located in Philadelphia. It is the third collaboration between Philadelphia-based restaurateurs Stephen Starr and Aimee Olexy, and Starr's twentieth restaurant in the city. The interior was designed by Roman and Williams. The firm also designed Starr's restaurants Upland and Le Coucou.

The location formerly housed Starr restaurant Serafina. The restaurant is priced to appeal to locals, rather than serve as a destination.

References

External links
 

Restaurants established in 2017
Restaurants in Philadelphia
2017 establishments in Pennsylvania